Alfie is a 1963 stage play written by Bill Naughton. Developed from a radio drama, the original London production starred John Neville, and the Broadway transfer starred Terence Stamp.

The play recounts the life of a working-class London ladies man, Alfie Elkins, and the many women who pass through his life. The play was adapted into a film twice, a 1966 version starring Michael Caine and a 2004 version starring Jude Law, with the location switched to Manhattan and the character being an ex-pat Cockney.

Origins
The character originated in a play for the BBC Third Programme entitled Alfie Elkins and His Little Life first broadcast on 7 January 1962. The life of Alfie (born about 1916) is retold from the early days of World War II to the late 1950s. In this version, the character was played by Bill Owen, later known for his role in Last of the Summer Wine. In the radio play, according to Robert Murphy, the character is placed in the world of spivs and semi-criminality rather than the swinging London of the first film. Murphy in Sixties British Cinema describes the character's personality in this version as possessing "an almost psychopathic vulgarity which links women, clothes and cars as commodities to be flaunted to prove to the world that he has achieved success without the privileges of birth or education".

Bernard Miles of the Mermaid Theatre commissioned Naughton to adapt his radio play for the stage.

Original production
Directed by Donald McWhinnie, the play ran at London's Mermaid Theatre from 19 June - 13 July 1963. It then transferred to the Duchess Theatre in the West End, where it opened on 22 July and closed on 30 November 1963.

Alfie - 	John Neville
Young Alfie - Arthur Mallen
Annie - 	Mary Hanefey
Ruby -         Margaret Courteney
Carla - 	Wendy Varnals
Flo - 	Edna Landor
Gilda - 	Gemma Jones
Guv’nor / Mr Smith - 	Norman Wynne
Harry Clamacraft - 	George Waring
Humphrey/Sharpey - 	David Battley
Joe - 	Jerry Verno
Lacey - 	Patrick Connor
Lily Clamacraft - 	Marcia Ashton
Lofty - 	Alan Townsend
Perc - 	Patrick Mower
Siddie - 	Glenda Jackson
Woman Doctor - 	Audine Leith

Norman Wynne was cast as the abortionist. To gain a license from the Lord Chamberlain's Office, then required for the play to be legally performed in the UK, the abortion had to occur off-stage. In the original script it was to take place behind a screen, but the censors readers' report commented it was "complete with groans and cries of pain, which I cannot think can be allowed". Among other changes, it was required that in the production "There must not be any jingle of instruments" and "Mr Smith scrubbing away is not to be seen or heard".

Harold Hobson wrote positively of the play in his review for The Sunday Times published on 4 August 1963:"Some of the scenes are melodramatic. ... Many episodes, however, are remarkably good. The best two are Alfie's official medical examination and preparation for and the aftermath of the abortion. ... It would seem improbable that an abortion scene should be dramatic, terrible and beautiful. This one is all three. Here only does Alfie, in a disjointed, uninhibited and profoundly moving and disturbing speech, see right into himself."Hobson described Alfie's monologue as "the high point of the play and of Mr. Neville's performance."

Broadway production
Directed by Gilchrist Calder, Alfie opened at New York's Morosco Theatre on 17 December 1964, and closed on 2 January 1965 after 21 performances.

Alfie - Terence Stamp 
Lily Clamacraft - Marcia Ashton
Ruby - Margaret Courtenay
Humphrey - Jeremy Geidt
Annie - Mary Hanefey  
Mr. Smith - George S. Irving 
Gilda - Juliet Mills
Joe - Jerry Verno 
Carla - Carol Booth
Harry Clamacraft - Donald Ewer
Perc - Peter Fenton 
Woman Doctor - Vanya Franck 
Lofty - James Luisi 
Siddie - Joanna Morris 
Flo - Sasha von Scherler

Naughton's 1992 obituary in The New York Times reported that the play had received extremely positive reviews despite the short run.

Other productions
The play was revived at the Octagon, Bolton in 2012 with David Ricardo-Pearce in the lead. Lyn Gardner in The Guardian, reviewing this production, wrote that the consequences of Alfie's actions begin to turn the drama into "a morality play, albeit one in which the (anti)hero addresses the audience directly to explain his philosophy of life. That device, and a taut, tight scene with a back-street abortionist hint at what this play might have been, and could perhaps be in a pared-down and edited version." As it is, the play, "like Alfie, feels like a bit of dinosaur".

References

External links
 
Acting edition of the script at Concord Theatricals

1963 plays
British plays adapted into films
Broadway plays
Plays about abortion